British railway rolling stock refers to the trains used in Britain (England, Scotland and Wales).

Main line operators
These lists only include trains currently reported in use on Network Rail routes. For details of previous rolling stock and future deliveries you should see the pages for the individual operators or the alternative lists in the 'see also' section at the bottom of this page.

Electrified routes generally use either 25,000V AC supplied by overhead lines, or 750V DC third rail. The majority of self-powered trains are diesel but other systems are being developed. Some trains use a combination of these power systems so that they can use different routes.

Multiple units and railcars

Locomotives

Passenger coaches and vans

Freight wagons
Examples of modern freight wagons used in Britain. Wagons with UIC codes may also operate in Europe.

Other networks
 Docklands Light Railway rolling stock
 Eurotunnel rolling stock
 Glasgow Subway rolling stock
 London Underground rolling stock
 Tyne and Wear Metro rolling stock

See also
British Rail and National Rail
 British Rail locomotive and multiple unit numbering and classification
 Steam locomotives of British Railways
 List of British Rail diesel multiple unit classes
 List of British Rail electric multiple unit classes
 List of British Rail modern traction locomotive classes

Other operators
 NI Rail (Northern Ireland, UK)

References

British railway-related lists
Rolling stock of the United Kingdom